Kalateh-ye Naser (also Romanized as Kalāteh-ye Nāşer; also known as Nāşer and Qal‘eh Nasir) is a village in Zirkuh Rural District, Central District, Zirkuh County, South Khorasan Province, Iran. At the 2006 census, its population was 12, in 5 families.

References 

Populated places in Zirkuh County